Nicole Collier Paggi (born August 15, 1983) is an American actress. She is best known her role of Jennie Bradbury in the critically acclaimed FOX television series Pasadena, which was directed by Diane Keaton and created by Mike White. She also had additional series regular roles, such as Sydney Shanowski on the first season of the television sitcom Hope & Faith alongside Kelly Ripa and Faith Ford, and as Sara Crawford on One one One.

Early life
Paggi was born in Travis County, Texas, and grew up in Austin, Texas. She spent two years studying in Los Angeles and New York focusing on becoming an actress.

Career
Paggi made her television debut in 2001 when she received the series regular role of Jennie Bradbury in the short-lived FOX television soap opera Pasadena (TV series). Following her role on Pasadena, She played the recurring role of Britney in the Emmy-Award winning NBC series Providence. Paggi continued to appear in guest roles on television series such as Glory Days, Fastlane, Judging Amy, CSI: Miami and the CBS pilot Expert Witness. In 2003, Paggi appeared in the television film Frozen Impact, playing the daughter of Ted McGinley's character, who would later play his daughter in the television series Hope & Faith.

In 2003, Paggi received the role of Sydney Shanowski on the ABC sitcom Hope & Faith, alongside Faith Ford and Kelly Ripa. She appeared throughout the series' first season.
Paggi received another television series regular role, as Sara Crawford in the UPN television sitcom One on One; during the show's fifth and final season. Her other television credits include guest appearances in Quintuplets, Jake in Progress, CSI: Crime Scene Investigation, for which she appeared in 2002 and again in 2008, Mad Love and 90210. Television films, Campus Confidential and Undercover Bridesmaid. In 2007, Paggi a leading role in the feature film Cielito Lindo, opposite Alejandro Alcondez, who also directed, produced and wrote the film.

In 2011, she starred in Girls Talk, a play written by Roger Kumble, alongside Brooke Shields and Constance Zimmer, and was nominated for an Ovation Award.

Personal life

After giving birth to her first daughter, Nicole stepped away from acting to focus on her family and being a mother. She had a second child with her husband and they moved away from Los Angeles. She has since returned to acting and has appeared in guest roles such as 9-1-1 on FOX,  The Rookie: Feds (2022), and The Sterling Affairs on FX (2023), playing Kristen Rivers (Doc Rivers wife).

Filmography

Awards and nominations
Ovation Awards
2011: Nominated for Featured Actress in a Play for the role of Scarlett in "Girls Talk"

References

External links 
 

Actresses from Austin, Texas
Living people
American television actresses
21st-century American actresses
People from Travis County, Texas
American film actresses
1983 births